The 2009–10 Lithuanian Football Cup is the 21st season of the Lithuanian annual football knock-out tournament. The competition started around 28 May 2009 with the matches of the First Round and will end in May 2010 with the Final. FK Sūduva are the defending champions.

The winner of this competition earned a place in the second qualifying round of the 2010–11 UEFA Europa League.

First round
In this round entered 35 teams from the Lithuanian third, fourth and fifth divisions. The matches were played around 28 May 2009.

|-
|colspan="3"|Walkover to next round: Venta Kursenai
|}

Second round
This round featured eighteen winners from the first round. The matches were played around 25 June 2009.

|}

Third round
Seven teams from the 2009 I Lyga, Lithuania's second division, entered the competition in this round and joined the nine winners from the second round. The matches were played between 27 July and 9 August 2009.

|}

Fourth round
This round featured eight winners from the third round. The matches were played on 18 August 2009.

|}

Fifth round
Four teams ranked fifth through eighth from the 2009 A Lyga entered the competition in this round and joined the four winners from the fourth round. The matches were played on 21 October 2009.

|}

Quarterfinals
Four teams ranked first through fourth from the 2009 A Lyga entered the competition in this round and joined the four winners from the fifth round. The matches were played on 7 and 8 November 2009.

|}

Semifinals
The first legs were played on March 31, 2010. The second legs were played on April 14, 2010. Second semifinal game in Marijampolė between FK Vėtra and FK Sūduva ended in some controversy. While full-time ended in a draw, during added time each team scored a goal. After the final whistle FK Vėtras players left the field thinking that the game ended in their victory on the away goal rule. But since in LFF Cup the away goal rule does not apply for goals scored during the added time, FK Vėtra premature celebrations were stopped by the referee and players had to return to the field for a penalty shootout which was won by FK Vėtra nonetheless.

|}

Final

The final is to be held at the S. Darius and S. Girėnas Stadium in Kaunas.

References

External links
 omnitel.net

Cup
Cup
2009–10 domestic association football cups
2009-10